Christopher A. McPhillips is a United States Marine Corps major general who is the Director of Strategic Planning and Policy of the United States Indo-Pacific Command. He previously was the Commander of the 1st Marine Aircraft Wing.

References

External links

Year of birth missing (living people)
Living people
Place of birth missing (living people)
United States Marine Corps generals